Ganikapudi is a village in Guntur district of the Indian state of Andhra Pradesh. It is located in Prathipadu mandal of Guntur revenue division.

Geography 

Government and politics 

Ganikapudi gram panchayat is the local self-government of the village. It is divided into wards and each ward is represented by a ward member. The ward members are headed by a Sarpanch. The village forms a part of Andhra Pradesh Capital Region and is under the jurisdiction of APCRDA.

Ganikapudi is a part of Prathipadu assembly constituency for Andhra Pradesh Legislative Assembly. Mekkathoti Sucharita is the present MLA of the constituency from YSRC Party. It is in turn a part of Guntur (Lok Sabha constituency).

Education 

As per the school information report for the academic year 2018–19, the village has a total of 2 Mandal Parishad schools.

References

External links 

Villages in Guntur district